The Louis Jehle House is a historic house located at 511 E. Fifth St. in Pana, Illinois. The house was built in 1895 for local businessman Louis Jehle. Prominent Bloomington architect George H. Miller designed the Queen Anne house; it is Miller's only design in Pana. A round tower with a Palladian window rises above the house's front entrance, which is located in a full-length porch. A second, octagonal tower extends above the roof line on the east side of the house. The second story and both towers are sided with patterned shingles. The house has a multi-component roof with a main gabled section and a cross gable in the back.

The Queen Anne features eleven spectacular stained glass windows and several jeweled stained glass doors. It is the only home in Christian County that is on the National Register of Historic Places.

In addition, the home has three beautiful fireplaces adorned with mirrors and hand carved mantels. The hardwood floors throughout are exceptional and various patterns inlaid with different hard woods.

The house was added to the National Register of Historic Places on April 20, 1995.

References

Houses on the National Register of Historic Places in Illinois
Queen Anne architecture in Illinois
Houses completed in 1895
Houses in Christian County, Illinois
National Register of Historic Places in Christian County, Illinois